The German Association of the Automotive Industry or VDA is a German interest group of the German automobile industry, both automobile manufactures and automobile component suppliers. It is member of the European Automobile Manufacturers Association (ACEA).

The VDA represents carmakers, including BMW, Volkswagen and Mercedes-Benz, but also counts foreign suppliers and foreign-owned carmakers like Opel among its members. The group is located in Berlin, Germany.

Activities
The VDA hosts the Europe's largest motor show, the biannual International Motor Show Germany (IAA) in Frankfurt.

The VDA published a series of standards and recommendations. Among those is the German quality management system (QMS) for the automobile industry. The fourth edition was issued in December 1998, and became mandatory for all German car makers on April 1, 1999.

The VDA is a founding member of both the ENX Association (since 2000) and Odette International (since 2001).

Leadership

 1989–1996: Erika Emmerich
 1996–2007: Bernd Gottschalk
 2007–2018: Matthias Wissmann
 2018–2020: Bernhard Mattes
 2020–present: Hildegard Müller

See also
VDA 6.1

References

External links

VDA homepage 
 

Automotive industry in Germany
Auto show organizers
Advocacy groups in Germany
Lobbying in Germany
Motor trade associations